The Sun Rises and The Sun Sets... and Still Our Time Is Endless is the second studio release from Life In Your Way. Released on Indiola Records in 2003.

Track listing
 "For The Flames Beneath Your Bridge, My Hearts Collapsed" - 4:58
 "Not A Word" - 3:56
 "Rewrite My Concepts" - 3:36
 "Long Letters" - 3:20
 "Meant To Be" - 3:21
 "My Devotion" - 2:48
 "Fall" - 4:45
 "Behind Unseen Walls" - 3:56
 "When It All Comes Down" - 3:30

References

Life in Your Way albums
2003 albums
Indianola Records albums